The 2008 United States Senate election in Kansas was held on November 4, 2008. Incumbent Republican U.S. Senator Pat Roberts won re-election to a third term.

Background 
The state of Kansas has not elected a Democrat to the U.S. Senate since 1932. Kansas's other Republican Senator Sam Brownback announced that he is retiring due to "self-imposed term limits," which meant Roberts became the senior senator from Kansas in 2011. It is considered one of the most Republican states in the U.S. The last time its electors went to a Democrat was the Presidential Election of 1964, when Lyndon Johnson carried the state over Barry Goldwater.

Roberts had announced ahead of the 1996 election that "I plan only to serve two terms in the U.S. Senate", but he broke that pledge in this election.

Republican primary

Candidates 
 Pat Roberts, incumbent U.S. Senator

Results

Democratic primary

Candidates 
 Jim Slattery, former U.S. Representative and nominee for Governor in 1994
 Lee Jones, nominee for the U.S. Senate in 2004

Results

General election

Candidates 
 Pat Roberts (R), incumbent U.S. Senator
 Jim Slattery (D), former U.S. Representative
 Randall Hodgkinson (L), attorney
 Joseph L. Martin (Re), nominee for Secretary of State in 2006

Predictions

Polling

Results 
Roberts won by 24 percentage points over Slattery, carrying 102 of the state's 105 counties. Slattery only carried three counties in northeast Kansas: Atchison, Douglas and Wyandotte.

See also 
 2008 United States Senate elections

References

External links 
 Elections & Legislative from the Kansas Secretary of State
 U.S. Congress candidates for Kansas at Project Vote Smart
 Kansas, U.S. Senate CQ Politics
 Kansas U.S. Senate from OurCampaigns.com
 Kansas U.S. Senate race from 2008 Race Tracker
 Campaign contributions from OpenSecrets
 Roberts (R-i) vs Slattery (D) graph of multiple polls from Pollster.com
 Official campaign websites (Archived)
 Pat Roberts for US Senate
 Jim Slattery for US Senate
 Lee Jones for US Senate

2008
Kansas
United States Senate